Christopher Harris (born April 1, 1972), known professionally as Zeuss, is an American record producer, mixer, guitarist, composer, and songwriter.

Biography
Zeuss is best known in the worlds of hard rock, heavy metal music, hardcore punk, and metalcore. He has engineered, produced, mixed, and mastered albums by a number of high-profile acts, including Rob Zombie, Queensrÿche, Demon Hunter, Suicide Silence, Suffocation, Municipal Waste, Soulfly, Chimaira, Throwdown, Whitechapel, Bleeding Through, Kataklysm, and God Forbid. He’s made over a half dozen records each with Shadows Fall (including the band’s most commercially successful album, The War Within) and Hatebreed. His relationship with Hatebreed extends to affiliated projects, including Kingdom of Sorrow, Jasta, and numerous artists signed to singer Jamey Jasta's Stillborn Records.

Rob Zombie, Joey Jordison, and Max Cavalera are among the musicians who have complimented Zeuss in the press.

Discography

Filmography

References

External links
Zeuss Official Website

American record producers
Heavy metal producers
Living people
1972 births